Kid Pan Alley is an American 501(c)(3) nonprofit organization based in Washington, Virginia founded by Paul Reisler of the band Trapezoid in 1999 that provides group songwriting residency programs to children in schools across the United States. Kid Pan Alley's mission is "to inspire and empower children to work together to become creators of their own music and to rekindle creativity as a core value in education". Founder & Artistic Director, Paul Reisler, guides the students through the group songwriting process and together they complete the songs in two class periods. The group songwriting process begins at the beginning of the week with Kid Pan Alley instructors working with students in their typical classroom setting where the students will brainstorm ideas, vote on the song's subject, and create lyrics and melodies with the instructors until the song is completed. Each class will perform their song in front of their school and community at a concert at the end of the week. The program is known for promoting community awareness of the arts while creating opportunities for children to explore their creativity through songwriting in a school setting. They have released four full-length, compilation studio albums of songs written with children during their songwriting residencies including Tidal Wave Of Song in 2001, Kid Pan Alley Nashville in 2006,  I Used To Know The Names Of All The Stars in 2008 and One Little Song Can Change the World in 2017. These albums feature artists including Amy Grant, Sissy Spacek, Raul Malo, Delbert McClinton, Kix Brooks & Cracker. Kid Pan Alley has written over 2,700 songs with over 60,000 children and their albums have won two Parent's Choice Awards, a WAMMIE award, a NAPPA Gold Award, and have also received one Grammy Award Nomination.

History 
Kid Pan Alley began back in 1999 in Rappahannock County, Virginia when Reisler conducted the first Kid Pan Alley residency with a local Elementary school where he wrote over 50 songs with 600 children. Shortly after, Reisler invited professional musicians from the county to record 19 of the 50 songs, in their own style, to be featured on Kid Pan Alley's first album release, Tidal Wave Of Song. In the following years, Kid Pan Alley expanded to surrounding counties and states working with children in schools all around the U.S. Reisler chose the name Kid Pan Alley as a play on words derived from New York City's Tin Pan Alley.

References

External links 
 Official website

Music organizations based in the United States
Children's music